Jacobs  may refer to:

Businesses and organisations
Jacob's, a brand name for several lines of biscuits and crackers in Ireland and the UK
Jacobs (coffee), a brand of coffee
Jacobs Aircraft Engine Company, former American aircraft engine company
Jacobs Engineering Group, an American international technical professional services firm
Jacobs Entertainment, an American gaming, hospitality, and entertainment company 
Jacobs School of Medicine and Biomedical Sciences, at the University at Buffalo, New York, U.S.
Jacobs School of Music, at, Indiana University, U.S.
Jacobs University Bremen, in Germany

Places
Jacobs, Louisville, Kentucky, U.S.
Jacobs, Pennsylvania, U.S., now Port Providence
Jacobs, Wisconsin, U.S.
Jacobs Island, Antarctica

Other uses
Jacobs (surname), including a list of people with this name
Jacobs F.C., a former Irish football club
, a tug, formerly Empire Gnome

See also 

 Jacob (disambiguation)
 Jacobs Creek (disambiguation)
 Jacobs River (disambiguation)
 Justice Jacobs (disambiguation)
 St. Jacobs, Ontario, Canada
 Jacobs Field, former name of Progressive Field in Cleveland, Ohio, U.S.